Acutalibacter is a genus of bacteria from the family of Ruminococcaceae with one known species (Acutalibacter muris). Acutalibacter muris has been isolated from the feces of a mouse from Munich in Germany.

References

Clostridiaceae
Monotypic bacteria genera
Bacteria genera